The Las Vegas High School Historic District in Las Vegas, Nevada is a historic district which includes 11 buildings on the  campus of the school district.  It was listed on the National Register of Historic Places in 2022.

It includes the Las Vegas High School Academic Building, Gymnasium, and Frazier Hall, now the Las Vegas Academy of International Studies and Performing Arts.  The academic building and gymnasium is an Art Deco building which was listed on the National Register in 1986, and which represents a subset of the Art Deco style known as "Aztec Moderne", in which Aztec design motifs were used in an overall Art Deco palette of forms and materials. The academic building and the gymnasium are two of the original 3 buildings that were built.  The third was destroyed around 1950.  The listing was expanded to include Frazier Hall in 2021.

Described as the best example of Art Deco in Las Vegas, the school was designed by father-and-son architects George A. Ferris & Son of Reno, Nevada. The stucco-covered reinforced concrete buildings are decorated with a variety of polychrome medallions and friezes depicting animals and plants. The gymnasium's entrance is rendered as a stylized Mayan arch. The Academic Building and Gymnasium are linked by the 1952 Humanities Building, which is not regarded as contributing to the historic character of the complex.

The school became a magnet school for specialized studies in 1993.

The Academic Building and Gymnasium were listed on the National Register of Historic Places on September 24, 1986. It was included as a contributing property in the National Register listing of the large Las Vegas High School Neighborhood Historic District in 1991. The academic building and gymnasium listing was enlarged in 2021 to include Frazier Hall. The entire campus was then listed on the National Register in 2022.

References 

National Register of Historic Places in Las Vegas
High schools in Las Vegas
Art Deco architecture in Nevada
Defunct schools in Nevada
School buildings on the National Register of Historic Places in Nevada
Individually listed contributing properties to historic districts on the National Register in Nevada
Historic districts on the National Register of Historic Places in Nevada